Gualdicciolo is a village (curazia) located in San Marino. It belongs to the municipality (castello) of Acquaviva and is its most populated parish.

Geography
The village is situated in the western corner of San Marino, close to the borders with Italy and the municipalities of San Leo and Verucchio, in Emilia-Romagna. The nearest Italian village to Gualdicciolo is Torello, part of San Leo.

Economy
Due to its position in a flat valley, Gualdicciolo has one of the most developed industrial areas of the state, with many manufacturing factories.

References

See also
Acquaviva
La Serra

Curazie in San Marino
Italy–San Marino border crossings
Acquaviva (San Marino)